Cataviña is a town in San Quintín Municipality, Baja California.

Geography
It is located 118 km (74 mi) south of El Rosario and 106 km (66 mi) north of the junction of Federal Highway 12 to Bahía de los Ángeles. It is accessible by Federal Highway 1.

Economy

The local economy is dependent on tourism, ranching (Rancho Santa Inés, on the outskirts of the town, is an ejido held in common by the residents), and a couple of private vendors selling gasoline from 55 gallon barrels.

Tourism
Cataviña has a first-rate hotel developed by the National Fund for the Promotion of Tourism in the Mexican government.  Nearby are some cave paintings and a field of giant rocks, mixed with desert vegetation, which make the area a place visited for lovers of ecotourism.

Those planning a trip that includes Cataviña, need to make sure to purchase enough fuel to get from El Rosario to Villa Jesús María, to avoid the necessity of buying the private vendor gasoline just mentioned (the Pemex station in Cataviña is closed, permanently.)

Missions
 Misión San Fernando Rey de España de Velicatá
 Misión Santa María de los Ángeles

See also
 Boojum tree
 Cardón cactus

External links

 Global Positioning System 

Cities in San Quintín Municipality